Ceriosperma is a genus of flowering plants belonging to the family Brassicaceae.

Its native range is Syria.

Species:
 Ceriosperma macrocarpum (Boiss.) Greuter & Burdet

References

Brassicaceae
Brassicaceae genera